Fernandão is a hypocorism of the name Fernando, and means "Big Fernando" or "Fernando Sr." in Portuguese.

People named Fernandão include:
Fernandão (footballer, born 1978) (1978–2014), full name Fernando Lúcio da Costa, Brazilian football manager and former footballer.
Fernandão (footballer, born 1987), full name José Fernando Viana de Santana, Brazilian footballer
Fernandão (futsal player) (born 1980), full name Fernando Maciel Gonçalves, Spanish-Brazilian futsal player
Fernando Ávila (born 1955), Brazilian former volleyball player

See also
Fernandinho
Fernando

Portuguese masculine given names